Stano is an unincorporated community in Grant County, Kansas, United States.  It lies on the border of Sherman and Sullivan Townships, at the intersection of the Cimarron Valley Railroad with Road C, 8 miles (13 km) west-southwest of the county seat of Ulysses.

References

Further reading

External links
 Grant County maps: Current, Historic, KDOT

Unincorporated communities in Grant County, Kansas
Unincorporated communities in Kansas